is a puzzle video game released by Taito in 1990.

Gameplay

Palamedes is a puzzle game requiring the players to match the dice they are holding to the dice at the top of the screen. Using the "B" button, the player can change the number on their dice, then throw it using the "A" button when it matches the dice at the top of the screen, which wipes the target dice off the board. By matching dice in some combinations, like doing it with the same number several times in a row, or by doing a 1-to-6 sequence, the player is awarded a special move where they can eliminate three to five lines of dice on the game field. At regular time intervals (which get smaller as the game progresses) new dice lines are added, and when a die touches the bottom of the screen, the game ends.

The player can play in "solitaire" mode against the computer or another player, or "tournament" mode against AI opponents. There are six sides and numbers on the dice, making an attempt to match all the numbers on the screen and eliminating them a challenge.

Ports
Ports of the game were published for the NES, MSX, FM Towns and Game Boy by HOT-B. The Japan-only sequel, Palamedes 2: Star Twinkles, was released in 1991 for the NES by HOT-B. It featured most of the same basic gameplay elements as the original but with the play field scrolling in the opposite direction.

Reception
In Japan, Game Machine listed Palamedes on their December 15, 1990 issue as being the sixteenth most-successful table arcade unit of the month.

David Wilson of Your Sinclair magazine reviewed the arcade game, giving it an 80% score. Zero magazine rated it three out of five.

Famitsu magazine reviewed the Game Boy version, scoring the game a 22 out of 40.

References

External links
Palamedes at Arcade History

1990 video games
Arcade video games
FM Towns games
Game Boy games
MSX2 games
Nintendo Entertainment System games
Takara video games
Multiplayer and single-player video games
Taito arcade games
Taito L System games
Video games scored by Kiyohiro Sada
Video games developed in Japan